The Malaysian lar gibbon (Hylobates lar lar) is  is an endangered subspecies of white-handed or lar gibbon. It is endemic to Malaysia, and Thailand.

The Malaysian lar gibbon often chooses taller canopy trees at locations with higher elevation for making calls. This subspecies also utilizes topographically convex areas, like hill tops and ridges, as the chosen locations over more concave areas, as it makes the calling location even taller. The reason why white-handed gibbon species, such as the Malaysian lar gibbon, prefer certain calling locations in higher areas, is because fewer obstacles physically intercept transmission of their calls, as reported in sound propagation studies of other primates.

References 

Primates of Asia
Mammals of Malaysia
Mammals of Thailand
Mammals described in 1771
Taxa named by Carl Linnaeus